The women's association football tournament at the 2007 Pan American Games took place from 12 to 26 July 2007.

Teams
The number of teams was expanded to 10 teams for this edition, with no age limit. The participants were:

CONCACAF

CONMEBOL

Preliminary round

Group A

Group B

Final round

Semifinals

Bronze-medal match

Gold-medal match

Final ranking

References 

Football at the 2007 Pan American Games
2007
2007 in women's association football